Magpie Bottom is a  biological Site of Special Scientific Interest north of Sevenoaks in Kent.

This steeply sloping area of chalk grassland has diverse herb flora, including the nationally rare Kentish milkwort and seven species of orchid, such as the scarce man orchid. There are also areas of woodland and scrub.

Public footpaths go through the site.

References

Sites of Special Scientific Interest in Kent